Truly She Is None Other is the eleventh solo album by Holly Golightly, former member of the band Thee Headcoatees, and is considered her most commercial album to date. It features nine original songs and four covers. The album's liner notes were written by Jack White.

Track listing
 "Walk a Mile" (Holly Golightly) – 2:44
 "All Around the Houses" (Golightly) – 4:01
 "Without You Here" (Golightly) – 2:57
 "One Neck" (Golightly) – 2:55
 "Time Will Tell" (Ray Davies) – 2:41
 "Black Night" (Robinson) – 4:08
 "It's All Me" (Golightly) – 2:18
 "She Said" (Golightly) – 2:03
 "Tell Me Now So I Know" (Davies) – 2:02
 "You Have Yet to Win" (Golightly) – 3:25
 "Sent" (Golightly) – 3:44
 "This Ship" (Golightly) – 4:37
 "There's an End" (C. Fox) – 3:33

Personnel
 Holly Golightly primary artist, guitar, percussion, vocals
 Eric Stein bass guitar, guitar
 John Gibbs bass guitar, guitar, double bass
 Bruce Brand guitar, percussion, concertina, drums
 Ed "Everything Louder Than Everything Else" Deegan guitar, engineer
 Sir Bald Diddley guitar, double bass

2003 albums
Holly Golightly (singer) albums
Damaged Goods (record label) albums
Albums produced by Liam Watson (record producer)